Balázs Venczel (born 6 March 1986) is a Hungarian football player.

References 
HLSZ
Lombard FC Papa Official Website

1986 births
Living people
Sportspeople from Szombathely
Hungarian footballers
Association football midfielders
Szombathelyi Haladás footballers
Budapest Honvéd FC players
Kaposvári Rákóczi FC players
FC Felcsút players
Lombard-Pápa TFC footballers
Vasas SC players